Lex scripta pl. leges scriptae is a Latin expression that means "written or statutory law". It is in contrast to lex non scripta, customary or common law.  The term originates from the Roman legal tradition.  Emperor Justinian divides the lex scripta into several categories:
Statutes
Plebiscita
Senatorial Decrees
The Decisions of the Emperors
Orders of the Magistrates
Answers of Jurisconsults

Lex scripta has a lasting effect that can define a legal tradition for a culture such as that found in the Corpus Juris Civilis, Magna Carta, Tang Code, or a country's constitution.

See also
List of Latin phrases
Latin legal terminology